From July to September 1987 forces loyal to Denis Sassou Nguesso defeated  forces which attempted to overthrow his regime. Pierre Anga, one of the coup leaders, fled to Owando where he was killed on September 6, 1987 ending the coup.

References

Congo coup d'état attempt
Republic of the Congo
Military coups in the Republic of the Congo
Republic of the Congo coup d'état attempt, 1987
Republic of the Congo coup d'état attempt
Republic of the Congo coup d'état attempt
Republic of the Congo coup d'état attempt
Attempted coups d'état in the Republic of the Congo